Raymond J. Ring Jr. (born May 22, 1945) is an American politician who served as a Democratic member of the South Dakota House of Representatives from January 11, 2013 to January 12, 2021.

Elections
2012 When District 17 incumbent Democratic Representative Tom Jones ran for South Dakota Senate and Republican Representative Jamie Boomgarden was term limited and retired, Ring ran in the June 5, 2012 Democratic Primary; in the three-way November 6, 2012 General election Republican nominee Nancy Rasmussen took the first seat and Ring took the second seat with 4,212 votes (33.0%) ahead of fellow Democratic nominee Marion Sorlien.

References

External links
Official page at the South Dakota Legislature
 

People from Marshall County, South Dakota
1945 births
Living people
Democratic Party members of the South Dakota House of Representatives
People from Vermillion, South Dakota
21st-century American politicians